Nathan Dixon may refer to:

Nathan F. Dixon I (1774–1842), United States Senator
Nathan F. Dixon II (1812–1881), United States Representative
Nathan F. Dixon III (1847–1897), U.S. Representative and Senator
Nathan Dixon (film) starring Barry Bell